A pet trust is a legal arrangement to provide care for a pet after its owner dies. A pet trust falls under trust law and is one option for pet owners who want to provide for their pets after they pass away. Alternatives include honorary bequests made through a will and contractual arrangements with the caregiver.

Pet trusts stipulate that in the event of a grantor’s disability or death a trustee will hold property (cash, for example) “in trust” for the benefit of the grantor’s pets. The “grantor” (also called a settlor or trustor in some states) is the person who creates the trust, which may take effect during a person’s lifetime or at death. Payments to designated caregivers will be made on a regular basis.

History
The development of pet trusts is part of the animal rights movement.

United States

All U.S. states have passed laws that allow some form of pet trust. Some states allow a pet trust to continue for the life of the pet, without regard to a maximum duration of 21 years. This is particularly advantageous for companion animals who have longer life expectancies than cats and dogs, such as horses and parrots.

See also
 Rachel Hirschfeld

References

External links
"Providing For Your Pets  In The Event of Your Death or Hospitalization". New York City Bar

Wills and trusts